This is a list of the number-one hits of 1987 on Italian Hit Parade Singles Chart.

Number-one artists

References

1987
1987 in Italian music
1987 record charts